Marcus Joseph Whelan (27 June 1914 – 31 August 1973) was an Australian rules footballer who played for Collingwood in the Victorian Football League (VFL).

Family
The son of John Whelan and Ellen Margaret Whelan, née Parker, he was born in Bacchus Marsh on 27 June 1914. He married Marjorie Alice Dummett on 14 October 1939.

Whelan's son Shane played for Collingwood between 1967 and 1969; and his granddaughter is the actress/television presenter Nicky Whelan.

Football

Collingwood
Whelan played mostly in the midfield as a centreman, although he played some 40 games at full-back. He was a fine, long drop-kick, and an expert place-kick. Whelan won the Brownlow Medal in 1939 and was also awarded Collingwood's best-and-fairest award, the Copeland Trophy. After fighting in World War II, he returned to the Victorian Football League in 1946 and retired at the end of the 1947 season.

Sports journalist Michael Roberts and former Australian rules footballer described Whelan as being "a famously cool, calm and polished performer."

In 1956, Jack Dyer called Whelan one of the best centremen of his time. “He was a spectacular player who could take a brilliant high mark and could hold his own with a ruckman,” Dyer wrote.

Fellow Collingwood player Bob Rose concurred: “He was a magnificent stab kick and could dispose of the ball perfectly while travelling at top speed.”

St Kilda
In 1948, he was cleared from Collingwood to play with the St Kilda Second XVIII as captain-coach.

Carrum
In 1949, he was appointed captain-coach of the Carrum Football Club in the Mornington Peninsula Football League.

Employment
Whelan worked at Carlton & United Breweries in Melbourne, alongside his coach Jock McHale.

Footnotes

References

 Football Ace Whelan: Crowd's Idol Gets Ready For Big Season, Pix, Vol.5, No.13 (Saturday, 30 March 1940), pp.28-31.
 Marcus Whelan (Collingwood) in an artistic place kick, The Argus Pictorial-Supplement, (Tuesday, 14 May 1940), p.6.

External links

 
 Boyles Football Photos: Marcus Whelan.
 World War Two Nominal Roll: Sergeant Marcus Joseph Whelan VX100842 (V275436).
 
 Marcus Whelan profile, Australian Football League website; accessed 12 June 2014.

1914 births
1973 deaths
Australian rules footballers from Victoria (Australia)
Australian Rules footballers: place kick exponents
Collingwood Football Club players
Collingwood Football Club Premiership players
Brownlow Medal winners
Copeland Trophy winners
Place of death missing
People from Bacchus Marsh
Australian Army personnel of World War II
Australian Army soldiers
Two-time VFL/AFL Premiership players